Kaitlin Willow Olson (born August 18, 1975) is an American actress. She began her career in The Sunday Company at the Groundlings, an improvisational theatre and school in Los Angeles, California. She had minor roles in several television series before being cast as Deandra "Sweet Dee" Reynolds on the FX comedy series It's Always Sunny in Philadelphia (2005–present).

Olson starred as Mackenzie "Mickey" Murphy in the Fox comedy series The Mick (2017–2018) and as Cricket Melfi in the Quibi comedy series Flipped (2020), which earned her a nomination for the Primetime Emmy Award for Outstanding Actress in a Short Form Comedy or Drama Series.

Olson has also appeared in films, including Leap Year (2010), The Heat (2013), Vacation (2015), Finding Dory (2016), and Arizona (2018).

In 2022, Olson earned an Emmy nomination for Outstanding Guest Actress in a Comedy Series for her role as DJ in HBO's Hacks.

Early life
Olson was born in Portland, Oregon, on August 18, 1975, to Donald Lee Olson, a publisher, and Melinda Leora, a nurse. Her family subsequently relocated back to the Portland area, settling in Tualatin, where Olson grew up on a farm. Her father worked as the publisher of the Portland Tribune from 2000 to 2001.

At age twelve, Olson was involved in a serious bicycle accident involving a vehicle, resulting in a fractured skull requiring reconstructive surgery. She graduated from Tigard High School in Tigard, Oregon in 1993.

Olson studied theater at the University of Oregon, graduating with a bachelor's degree in theater arts in 1997. After college, she moved to Los Angeles to pursue acting professionally.

Career
Olson was a member of The Groundlings Sunday Company along with Dax Shepard. She toured with the USO to Bosnia, Kosovo and Norway. She made several guest appearances in films and television series such as Curb Your Enthusiasm, The Drew Carey Show, The Jamie Kennedy Experiment, Out of Practice, Miss Match, Family Guy, and Punk'd. She had a minor role in the film Coyote Ugly.

In 2004, she was cast as Deandra "Sweet Dee" Reynolds in the FX sitcom It's Always Sunny in Philadelphia. She also voiced Ethel in the first season of the Comedy Central animated series Brickleberry. In the 2013 film The Heat she appeared as a Bulgarian druggie who engages in an exchange of cultural perspectives and insults with Melissa McCarthy's character.

She played a recurring role as Hartley Underwood, the "one-armed" neighbor in the FX series The Riches. In June 2016, the Human Rights Campaign released a video in tribute to the victims of the Orlando nightclub shooting; in the video, Olson and others told the stories of the people killed there. Also in 2016, Olson provided the voice of Destiny in Disney's Finding Dory.

She starred in the Fox sitcom The Mick, which premiered in January 2017. She also served as an executive producer for the series. The second season of The Mick premiered in September 2017. Fox cancelled the series after its second season ended in April 2018.

Olson appears in Hacks as DJ, Deborah Vance's troubled daughter.

Personal life

Olson married her It's Always Sunny in Philadelphia co-star, Rob McElhenney, in California on September 27, 2008. The couple started dating secretly during the second season of the series.

In 2009, McElhenney and Olson announced their purchase of Skinner's Bar in Philadelphia. It was renamed Mac's Tavern. Their first child is a son, Axel Lee. Olson went into labor at a game between the Los Angeles Dodgers and the Philadelphia Phillies, and Axel was born in their California home as planned. Their second son is Leo Grey McElhenney.

Filmography

Film

Television

Video games

Music videos

References

External links

Kaitlin Olson at WorldCat

20th-century American actresses
21st-century American actresses
Actresses from Portland, Oregon
Actresses from Washington (state)
American film actresses
American television actresses
American voice actresses
American women comedians
Comedians from Oregon
Living people
People from Tigard, Oregon
University of Oregon alumni
20th-century American comedians
21st-century American comedians
People from Vashon, Washington
1975 births